Birdland Animal Park is a wildlife park located on the South Coast of New South Wales, Australia.

The wildlife park is situated in a natural bushland setting adjoining Joes Creek, and the park's facilities include an orphanage for rescued animals, up-close interaction with wombats and diamond pythons, walkthrough kangaroo areas and miniature train rides.

List of animals

 Agile wallaby
 Alexandrine parrot
 Alpaca
 Australian green tree frog
 Australian king parrot
 Australian pelican
 Australian boobook owl
 Barbary dove
 Bare-nosed wombat
 Black swan
 Blue peafowl
 Budgerigar
 Bush stone curlew
 Chestnut-eared finch
 Chukar partridge
 Cockatiel
 Common bronzewing
 Cunningham's spiny-tailed skink
 Diamond python
 Domestic goat
 Domestic rabbit
 Eastern bearded dragon
 Eastern blue-tongued lizard
 Eastern grey kangaroo
 Eastern long-necked turtle
 Eastern short-necked turtle
 Eclectus parrot
 Emu
 European fallow deer
 Freshwater catfish
 Galah
 Golden pheasant
 Jacky dragon
 Japanese quail
 King quail
 Koala
 Lace tree goanna
 Laughing kookaburra
 Little corella
 Little pied cormorant
 Long-nosed potoroo
 Major Mitchell's cockatoo
 Masked lapwing
 Masked owl
 Nankeen night heron
 Princess parrot
 Rainbow lorikeet
 Red kangaroo
 Red-rumped parrot
 Red-tailed black cockatoo
 Reeve's pheasant
 Regent parrot
 Ring-necked pheasant
 Rose-ringed parakeet
 Saw-shelled turtle
 Scaly-breasted lorikeet
 Short-beaked echidna
 Southern hairy-nosed wombat
 Spiny leaf insect
 Sulphur-crested cockatoo
 Swamp wallaby
 Tammar wallaby
 Tawny frogmouth
 Wedge-tailed eagle
 White-headed pigeon
 Wonga pigeon
 Yellow canary

References

External links 

Wildlife parks in Australia
Zoos in New South Wales
South Coast (New South Wales)